Ricardo Chávez Soto (born 19 November 1994) is a Mexican professional footballer who plays as a right-back for Liga MX club Atlético San Luis.

References

1994 births
Living people
Mexican footballers
Association football defenders
Tigres UANL footballers
Correcaminos UAT footballers
Cimarrones de Sonora players
FC Juárez footballers
Club Necaxa footballers
Atlético San Luis footballers
Liga MX players
Ascenso MX players
Liga Premier de México players
Tercera División de México players
Footballers from Tamaulipas
People from Ciudad Victoria